Long Lost Family may refer to:

Long Lost Family (British TV series) (2011–present), based on the Dutch series Spoorloos
Long Lost Family (American TV series) (2016–present), also based on Spoorloos
Long Lost Family (Australian TV series) (2016), also based on Spoorloos